The 1996 CAF Cup was the fifth football club tournament season that took place for the runners-up of each African country's domestic league. It was won by Kawkab Marrakesh in two-legged final victory against ES Sahel.

Preliminary round

|}

First round

|}

Notes
1 ASC Garde Nationale were disqualified because their federations were in debt to CAF.

Second round

|}

Notes
1 Winner was to be determined in a single match in Freetown, Sierra Leone, due to civil war in Liberia; Junior Professional withdrew.

Quarter-finals

|}

Semi-finals

|}

Final

|}

Winners

External links
CAF Cup 1996 - rsssf.com

3
1996